"Overdose" is a song by South Korean–Chinese boy band Exo, released on May 7, 2014, as the lead single of their second EP Overdose. It was released in both Korean and Chinese versions by their label SM Entertainment. It was the final release by members Kris and Luhan following their lawsuits in May 2014, and October 2014 respectively. It was also the last single performed by Exo-M and Exo-K.

Background and release 
Produced by The Underdogs, "Overdose" described as a heavy-hitting, urban-pop banger with hard rhythms of hip-hop, R&B hooks and electronic beats with the lyrics of the feeling of overdosing on a sweet drug as a metaphor to describe a man's intense addiction to love. The song was released on May 7, 2014 together with the EP.

The Korean and Chinese music videos for "Overdose" were released on May 6, 2014. The music video shows the members in a maze-like setting while they perform the choreography. On May 5, 2016, the Korean music video reached 100 million views, and later reached 200 million views on September 23, 2019, becoming their fifth music video to do so. Exo-K began performing the song on South Korean music television programs on April 11, 2014 and Exo-M began performing the song on the Chinese weekly music program, Global Chinese Music on April 19.

Reception 
"Overdose" debuted at number two on the Gaon Digital Chart and at number two at the Billboard World Digital Songs chart. The Korean version of the song went on to win first place eight times while the Chinese version won first place two times. The song sold more than 1 million copies in less than a year from its release.

Charts

Weekly charts

Monthly charts

Yearly charts

Sales

Accolades

References 

Exo songs
2014 songs
2014 singles
Korean-language songs
SM Entertainment singles
Songs written by Kenzie (songwriter)
Songs written by Harvey Mason Jr.
Songs written by Damon Thomas (record producer)